Shabudin or Shabuddin is an Asian masculine given name. Notable people with the name include:

Shabuddin H. Rahimtoola (born 1931), Indian cardiologist
Shabudin Yahaya (born 1965), Malaysian politician

Asian given names
Masculine given names